Thomas Francis Schlafly (born October 28, 1948) is an American businessman and writer. He co-founded the Saint Louis Brewery, which produces the Schlafly line of beers. Schlafly is a graduate of the Saint Louis Priory School, and received his A.B. and J.D. from Georgetown University.

In his capacity with the brewery, he writes a column every month, "Top Fermentation". In 2006, he published A New Religion in Mecca: Memoir of a Renegade Brewery in St. Louis (Virginia Publishing), which recounted the founding of the Saint Louis Brewery. He is also an attorney, working as a partner in the St. Louis office of Thompson Coburn. He is a nephew of St. Louis conservative commentator Phyllis Schlafly.

In 2012, Schlafly was a member of a group of St. Louisans who assumed ownership of the St. Louis Blues National Hockey League ice hockey team.

External links
Thomas Schlafly at Thompson Coburn's website.
Saint Louis Brewery website
Top Fermentation columns

References

1948 births
Living people
American columnists
American people of Swiss descent
American brewers
Georgetown University Law Center alumni
Missouri lawyers
Writers from St. Louis
Businesspeople from St. Louis
Beer writers

20th-century American businesspeople